Saint Pantaleon may refer to:

 Saint Pantaleon, a saint
 St. Panteleimon Monastery, his shrine on Mount Athos

Saint-Pantaléon is the name or part of the name of several communes in southern France:

 Saint-Pantaléon, Lot, in the Lot département, Midi-Pyrénées
 Saint-Pantaléon, Vaucluse, in the Vaucluse département, Provence - a wine-growing village
 Saint-Pantaléon-de-Lapleau, in the Corrèze département, Limousin
 Saint-Pantaléon-de-Larche, in the Corrèze département, at the border of Périgord and Quercy
 Saint-Pantaléon-les-Vignes, in the Drôme département, Rhône-Alpes - a wine-growing village that is part of the Côtes du Rhône vineyard region